Campertogno is a comune (municipality) in the Province of Vercelli in the Italian region Piedmont, located about  northeast of Turin and about  northwest of Vercelli.

Campertogno borders the following municipalities: Boccioleto, Mollia, Piode, Rassa, Riva Valdobbia, and Scopello.

References